Rafael Román Meléndez is a teacher and school principal, and was the Secretary of Education of Puerto Rico. Before being appointed as Secretary, Román served as President of the Organization of School Administrators and Principals of Puerto Rico. He obtained a bachelor's degree in Secondary Education and Teaching from the University of Puerto Rico at Cayey in 1999, and a Master of Education from the Metropolitan University in 2005.

Román is the youngest person to hold the post of Secretary of Education in the history of Puerto Rico.

Notes

References

External links
 

Year of birth missing (living people)
Living people
People from Arroyo, Puerto Rico
Members of the 16th Cabinet of Puerto Rico
Secretaries of Education of Puerto Rico
Puerto Rican educators
University of Puerto Rico alumni